Falsiporphyromonas is a genus from the family of Porphyromonadaceae, with one known species (Falsiporphyromonas endometrii).

References

Further reading 
 

Bacteroidia
Bacteria genera
Monotypic bacteria genera